Manifesto is the second full-length studio album from Christian band Pocket Full of Rocks. It was released on July 24, 2007 by Myrrh Records.

Track listing

 "Good To Be Here" - 3:24
 "At The Cross" - 3:42
 "Who Is This King?" - 4:40
 "Let The Worshippers Arise" - 3:36
 "Beautiful You" - 3:36
 "Your Love" - 3:15
 "Water (There Is No One Like You)" - 3:55
 "Heal" - 4:34
 "My Everything" - 3:55
 "Take Me There" - 4:02
 "Worst Of Us" - 4:49
 "There You Are" - 3:52
 "At The Cross (Reprise Extended Version)" - 3:42

Reception

Chart performance

The album peaked at No.30 on Billboard's Christian Albums and No.27 on Heatseekers Albums.

Awards

The album received a nomination at the 39th GMA Dove Awards for Praise & Worship Album of the Year.

References

External links
Manifesto on Amazon.com

2007 albums